Phansidewa is a village  in the Phansidewa CD block in the Siliguri subdivision of the Darjeeling district in the state of West Bengal, India.

Geography

Location                     

Phansidewa is shown as being located in Bandar Gachh mouza in the map of  Phansidewa CD block on page 327 of District Census Handbook, Darjeeling.

Area overview
The map alongside shows the Siliguri subdivision of Darjeeling district. This area is spread across the foothills of the Himalayas and is a plain land gently sloping from north to south. While the northern part is mentioned as the Terai region, the larger southern portion forms the western part of the Dooars region. While 55.11% per cent of the population resides in the rural areas, 44.89% resides in the urban areas. On the western side the Mechi River forms a long border with Nepal. On the eastern side the Mahananda River forms a short border with Bangladesh.

Note: The map alongside presents some of the notable locations in the subdivision. All places marked in the map are linked in the larger full screen map.

Demographics
According to the 2011 Census of India, Bandar Gachh had a total population of 3.891 of which 2,020 (52%) were males and 1,871 (48%) were females. There were 380 persons in the age range of 0 to 6 years. The total number of literate people in Bandar Gachh was 2,825 (72.60% of the population over 6 years).

Civic Administration

Police station
Phansidewa police station has jurisdiction over the Phansidewa CD block.

CD block HQ
The headquarters of the Phansidewa CD block is at Phansidewa.

Transport
The station at Nijbari, on the Howrah-New Jalpaiguri line, located nearby. Nijbari is 15 km from New Jalpaiguri.

Education
Phansidewa High School is a Bengali-medium coeducational institution established in 1865. It has facilities for teaching from class V to class XII. It has 14 computers, a library with 1,520 books and a playground.

Phansidewa Girls High School is a Bengali-medium girls only institution established in 1980. It has facilities for teaching from class V to class XII. It has a playground.

References

Villages in Darjeeling district